Walter "Gid" Miller (September 25, 1887 – December 19, 1959) was a Canadian professional ice hockey player. He played with the Montreal Wanderers and Ottawa Senators of the National Hockey Association. He appeared in 10 games for the Wanderers in the 1912–13 and 1913–14 seasons, and two games for the Senators in the 1913–14 season.

During the 1908–09 season, while with the Brantford Indians of the OPHL, Miller and the Indians were involved in a train accident outside of Guelph on January 14, 1909 where Miller suffered a season ending hand injury (cut off finger) when the rear coach of the Grand Trunk Railway passenger train they were traveling with ran into a ditch and overturned.

References

External links
Walter Miller at JustSportsStats

1887 births
1959 deaths
Canadian ice hockey centres
Ice hockey people from Ontario
Montreal Wanderers (NHA) players
Ottawa Senators (NHA) players
Sportspeople from Peterborough, Ontario